J. Sahler House, also known as Elm Rock, is a historic home located at Rochester in Ulster County, New York.  It is a -story, Federal-style brick house built about 1807.  Also on the property is a small barn.

It was listed on the National Register of Historic Places in 2000.

References

Houses on the National Register of Historic Places in New York (state)
Federal architecture in New York (state)
Houses completed in 1807
Houses in Ulster County, New York
National Register of Historic Places in Ulster County, New York